Menzie is a given name and a surname. Notable persons with the name include:

DeQuan Menzie (born 1990), American football player
Menzie Chinn (born 1961), American academic
Menzie Yere (born 1983), Papua New Guinean rugby league player

See also
Mario Acevedo (born 1969), Guatemalan football player